Eirini Stachtiari (born 27 July 1977) is a Greek former basketball player who competed in the 2004 Summer Olympics.

References

1977 births
Living people
Greek women's basketball players
Olympic basketball players of Greece
Basketball players at the 2004 Summer Olympics